This is a list of aviation-related events from 1953:

Events 
The first year in which the world's airlines carried more than 50 million people.
Argentina initiates a study of the feasibility of converting either a cargo ship or a heavy cruiser into an aircraft carrier in an Argentine shipyard. Ultimately, no conversion takes place.
During the Korean War, Communist aircraft attack the U.S. Navy rocket-equipped medium landing ship USS LSM(R)-409 off Korea, but do not damage her.
Kuwait National Airways, the future Kuwait Airways, is founded. It will begin flight operations in March 1954. 
The Experimental Aircraft Association and annual EAA Convention and Fly-In were founded.
 Thanks to a decreasing interest in seaplanes and flying boats, flying operations cease at the Royal Air Force′s Marine Aircraft Experimental Establishment (MAEE), as does the organization's connection with the RAF. The MAEE will survive until March 1956, evaluating prototype marine craft and air-sea rescue apparati and associated equipment.

January
 January 1 – The United States Army formally deletes glider operations from its capabilities.
 January 5 – The British European Airways Vickers VC.1 Type 610 Viking 1B Lord St. Vincent crashes on approach to Nutts Corner in Northern Ireland, killing 27 of the 35 people on board.
 January 6 – The West German airline Luftag is founded. It will acquire the name and logo of the defunct airline Deutsche Luft Hansa in August 1954, rename itself Lufthansa, and begin flight operations in April 1955.
 January 7
A Civil Air Patrol pilot discovers the aircraft's wreckage on January 12.
 January 15 – Two Royal Air Force planes, an Avro Lancaster maritime patrol aircraft of No. 38 Squadron and a Vickers Valetta transport aircraft, collide over the Strait of Sicily in heavy rain and poor visibility and crash. The accident kills all 19 people aboard the Valetta and the Lancasters entire crew of seven.
 January 16 – A United States Air Force Douglas C-54D-5-DC Skymaster crashes in rocky terrain while on final approach to Ernest Harmon Air Force Base in Stephenville, Newfoundland, killing 13 of the 14 people on board.
 January 26
 A Linee Aeree Italiane Douglas C-47-DL Skytrain suffers the failure of its left wing due to overstressing and crashes in mountainous terrain near Sinnai, Sardinia, Italy, killing all 19 people on board.
 The first meeting of the Experimental Aircraft Association takes place at Milwaukee, Wisconsin's Curtiss-Wright Field.
 January 31 – United States Air Force Captain Ben L. Fithian (pilot) and Lieutenant Sam R. Lyons score the first aerial victory in a Lockheed F-94 Starfire, shooting down a Lavochkin La-9 (NATO reporting name "Fritz") over Korea. It is the first of four kills by F-94s during the Korean War.

February
 Royal Navy Fleet Air Arm No. 705 Squadron Westland Dragonfly helicopters and other services rescue 600 people over a period of two weeks during severe flooding in the Netherlands. No. 705 Squadron loses one helicopter during the operations.
 No. 194 Squadron is commissioned as the Royal Air Force's first helicopter squadron.
 February 2 – A Skyways Limited Avro York with 39 people on board disappears over the North Atlantic Ocean during a flight from Lajes Field in the Azores to Gander, Newfoundland. No trace of the airliner or its occupants ever is found.
 February 7 – A Union Aéromaritime de Transport Douglas C-54A-5-DC Skymaster (registration F-BFGR) crashes into a small wood on approach to Bordeaux–Mérignac Airport in Bordeaux, France, killing nine of the 21 people on board.
 February 10 – A United States Air Force Fairchild C-119C-18-FA Flying Boxcar (registration 50–0127) crashes in a snowstorm on approach to Bitburg Air Base in West Germany, killing all five people on board.
Some wreckage and bodies are found the following day, but most of the wreckage will not be found until May 20.
 February 28 – The Soviet Union transfers 10 Tupolev Tu-4 (NATO reporting name "Bull") heavy bombers to the People's Republic of China.

March
 March 3 – The first fatal crash involving a passenger jetliner takes place when the pilot of the Canadian Pacific Air Lines De Havilland DH.106 Comet 1A Empress of Hawaii (registration CF-CUN) lifts its nose too high during its takeoff run at Karachi Airport in Karachi, Pakistan, for a ferry/positioning flight. The aircraft fails to become airborne and crashes into a dry riverbed, killing all 11 people on board.
 March 10 – Czechoslovakian Mikoyan-Gurevich MiG-15s shoot down a United States Air Force F-84 Thunderjet in Czechoslovakian airspace.
 March 12 – Soviet fighters shoot down a Royal Air Force Avro Lincoln over East Germany.
 March 14 – After its pilot descends in poor visibility to ascertain his position during a flight from Delhi, India, to Dacca, East Pakistan, an Orient Airways Convair CV-240-7 (registration AP-AEG) crashes into a mountain south of Kalahasahar, India, killing all 16 people on board.
 March 17 – An Aigle Azur Douglas C-47A Skytrain (registration F-BEFG) crashes on approach to Da Nang Airport in Da Nang, French Indochina, and catches fire, killing all eight people on board.
 March 18
An East German Junkers Ju 52/3m operated by the Kasernierte Volkspolizei crashes during its initial climb from Cottbus-Drewitz Airport in Drewitz, East Germany, killing all 11 people on board.
The B-36 crashes and bursts into flames, killing its entire crew of 23. Brigadier General Richard E. Ellsworth, the plane's copilot, is among the dead. A U.S. Air Force Boeing SB-29 Superfortress search and rescue plane sent out to assist in search efforts disappears and is presumed to have crashed as well.
 March 20 – Transocean Airlines Flight 942, a Douglas C-54G-10-DO Skymaster (registration N88942) carrying military personnel from Walker Air Force Base in Roswell, New Mexico, to Oakland International Airport in Oakland, California, suddenly goes into a steep descent and crashes in a field southwest of Alvarado, California, killing all 35 people on board.
 March 23 – Czechoslovakian airline captain Mira Slovak and a few co-conspirators hijack a Czech Airlines Douglas DC-3 commercial airliner with 24 passengers aboard during a domestic flight from Prague to Brno and flies it to West Germany, where United States Air Force F-84 Thunderjets escort it to a landing at Frankfurt-am-Main. He defects to the West; four of the passengers choose to remain in the West.
 March 27 – The Netherlands establishes the Royal Netherlands Air Force as an independent service.
 March 29 – The Central African Airways Vickers VC.1 Viking Shangani (registration VP-YEY) disintegrates in mid-air near Mkwaya, Tanganyika, after encountering a sudden strong gust of wind during a flight from Chileka Airport in Blantyre, Nyasaland, to Dar es Salaam International Airport in Dar es Salaam, Tanganyika, killing all 13 people aboard. Investigators blame corrosion of the aircraft's starboard boom for the disaster.

April
 April 1 – British European Airways and Air France introduce "Tourist Class" fares.
 April 3 – BOAC introduces a weekly service to Tokyo (Japan) by the de Havilland Comet 1 jet airliner.
 April 10 – During takeoff from Palisadoes Airport in Kingston, Jamaica, for the inaugural flight of Caribbean International Airways with the airline's owner, Owen Roberts, as its pilot, a Lockheed 18-56-23 Lodestar (registration VP-JBC) suffers the failure of an engine. Roberts is among the dead.
 April 14 – While on approach to Boeing Field in Seattle, Washington, a Miami Airlines Douglas DC-3C (registration N65743) strikes 150-to-200-foot- (46-to-61-meter-) tall trees at the  level of Cedar Mountain and crashes east of Selleck, Washington, killing seven of the 25 people on board.
 April 16 – An Aigle Azur Douglas C-47A-75-DL Skytrain (registration F-BESS) operating on a military charter flight to Nà Sản Airport in Sơn La, French Indochina, loses a wing shortly after takeoff from Gia Lam Airport in Hanoi, French Indochina, and crashes, killing all 30 people on board.
 April 17 – The United States Air Force establishes the Seventeenth Air Force, activating it for service in North Africa, Portugal, the Mediterranean, Austria, the Middle East, Pakistan, India, and Ceylon.
 April 24 - Tragedy strikes the United States Air Force's Project Tip Tow – which tests the feasibility of strategic bombers carrying fighter aircraft attached to their wingtips to defend them against enemy interceptors – when an EF-84D Thunderjet flips over onto the wing of an ETB-29A Superfortress after attaching to its wingtip, causing the EF-84D, the ETB-29A, and another EF-84D attached to the ETB-29A's other wingtip to crash, killing everyone aboard all three aircraft.

May
 May 9 – An Air India Douglas C-47A-25-DK Skytrain (registration VT-AUD) overbanks during a steep right turn five minutes after takeoff from Palam Airport in New Delhi, India, and crashes, killing all 18 people on board.
 May 11 – INS Garuda opens, serving as the base for the Indian Naval Air Arm.
 May 12 – The second Bell X-2 research aircraft explodes over Lake Ontario while mated to its Boeing EB-50 Superfortress mothership, killing test pilot Jean "Skip" Ziegler and an EB-50 crewman and critically damaging the EB-50, which manages to land safely.
 May 13 – 59 U.S. Air Force F-84G Thunderjet fighter-bombers attack the Toksan dike in Korea.
 May 16 – 90 U.S. Air Force F-84 Thunderjets carry out a successful attack against Chusan, Korea.
 May 17 – After entering a thunderstorm while on approach to Greater Shreveport Municipal Airport in Shreveport, Louisiana, Delta Air Lines Flight 318 – a Douglas DC-3DST-318 (registration N28345) – is forced down to a very low altitude, where it strikes trees and crashes east of Marshall, Texas, killing 19 of the 20 people on board.
 May 18
On his last day of combat, U.S. Air Force Captain Joseph C. McConnell shoots down three MiG-15s (NATO reporting name "Fagot") during two sorties over Korea in the F-86F-1 Sabre Beauteous Butch II. He has shot down 16 aircraft, all MiG-15s, in his four months of combat, making him the top-scoring American fighter pilot of the Korean War and the first American triple jet ace. He remains the top-scoring American jet ace in history.
She also sets a new womens international speed-over-distance record over a  closed course, averaging .
 May 19 – The U.S. Joint Chiefs of Staff recommend that United Nations air and naval operations expand into Manchuria and other parts of the People's Republic of China and include the use of nuclear weapons, if necessary, in order to force an end to the Korean War. The U.S. National Security Council approves the recommendation the following day.
 May 20 – Flying a North American F-86 Sabre, Jacqueline "Jackie" Cochran sets a women's world speed record.

June
 The U.S. Joint Intelligence Committee estimates that the Soviet Union could employ 12,000 tactical aircraft in support of Soviet Army ground forces if the Soviets began an offensive against the North Atlantic Treay Organization (NATO) in Europe.
 June 1 – The U.S. Air Force Thunderbirds are activated as the 3600th Air Demonstration Team at Luke Air Force Base, Arizona.
 June 2 – To ensure television viewers in Canada can see the Coronation of Queen Elizabeth II in London on the same day that it takes place, British Royal Air Force English Electric Canberras fly film of the ceremony across the Atlantic Ocean to be broadcast by the Canadian Broadcasting Corporation, the first non-stop flight between the United Kingdom and the Canadian mainland. At Goose Bay in Labrador the film is transferred to a Royal Canadian Air Force Avro Canada CF-100 Canuck jet fighter for the further trip to Montreal. In all, three such voyages are made as the ceremonies proceed.
In the ensuing dogfight, he shoots down two and damages a third before withdrawing safely.
 June 11 – The second prototype of the Gloster Javelin crashes. Gloster test pilot Peter Godfrey Lawrence ejects at an altitude of about  but is killed.
 June 14 – Lightning strikes Aeroflot Flight 229 – an Ilyushin Il-12 (registration CCCP-L1375) on a domestic flight in the Soviet Union – after it enters a sudden and severe thunderstorm. The aircraft crashes nose first into a wooded hillside northeast of Zugdidi in the Georgian Soviet Socialist Republic and catches fire, killing all 18 people on board. The Georgian film actress Nato Vachnadze is among the dead.
 June 15
The British Royal Navy aircraft carriers HMS Eagle, HMS Perseus, and HMS Theseus, the Royal Canadian Navy aircraft carrier HMCS Magnificent, and the Royal Australian Navy aircraft carrier HMAS Sydney and 37 squadrons of Fleet Air Arm and Royal Naval Volunteer Reserve aircraft – including Fireflies, Sea Furies, Seafires, Attackers, Vampires, Skyraiders, Sea Hornets, Meteors, Avengers, Gannets, Wyverns, Sea Venoms, Sea Hawks, and Dragonflies – take part in the Coronation Review of the Fleet for Queen Elizabeth II. The ceremonies include a fly-past by 300 naval aircraft.
A LACSA Douglas C-47B-5-DK Skytrain (registration TI-1002) crashes into a mountainside in Costa Rica's San Ramon Mountains, killing nine of the 15 people on board.
A LAN Chile Lockheed 18-56-23 Lodestar (registration CC-CLD-0100) crashes near Chamonate Airport outside Copiapó, Chile, after an engine fire, killing all seven people on board.
 June 16
A United States Marine Corps AD-4 Skyraider scores the only documented air-to-air kill of the Korean War by a Skyraider, shooting down a Polikarpov Po-2 (NATO reporting name "Mule") biplane.
An Aigle Azur Douglas C-47A-65-DL Skytrain (registration F-BEST) on a domestic flight in French Indochina from Wattay Airport in Vientiane to Tân Sơn Nhất Airfield near Saigon catches fire in mid-air and crashes on Phou-Lassi Hill in what would later become Laos, killing all 34 people on board. The aircraft's wreckage is discovered on June 29.
 June 17 – A Panair do Brasil Lockheed L-049 Constellation (registration PP-PDA) crashes in a narrow valley on final approach to São Paulo–Congonhas Airport in São Paulo, Brazil, killing all 17 people on board.
 June 18
 A United States Air Force Douglas C-124 Globemaster II crashes just after takeoff from Tachikawa Airfield near Tokyo, Japan, killing all 129 people on board. It is the deadliest air crash in history at the time and the first with a confirmed death toll exceeding 100. The toll surpasses a 1952 crash in Moses Lake, Washington, in the United States, also involving a U.S. Air Force Globemaster II.
 René Fonck, the top-scoring Allied and second-highest-scoring ace overall of World War I with 75 kills, dies in Paris, France at the age of 59.
 June 23 – Lieutenant Commander George H. Whisler, Jr., of U.S. Navy Air Transport Squadron 31 (VR-31), a ferry squadron, makes the first round-trip across the continental United States to be completed between sunrise and sunset. Departing Naval Air Station Norfolk, Virginia, in a Grumman F9F-6 Cougar at 05:18 local time, he makes stops at Naval Air Station Memphis, Tennessee, and Webb Air Force Base, Texas, before arriving at Naval Air Station North Island, California at 09:05 local time. At 09:55 local time, he takes off from North Island in a Douglas F3D-2 Skyknight, stops at Naval Air Station Dallas, Texas, to refuel, and lands at Naval Air Station Norfolk at 19:21 local time.
 June 30
Attacked by ten MiGs, U.S. Air Force pilot Ralph S. Parr, flying an F-86 Sabre, shoots down two of them and drives the rest off despite being low on fuel, escorting the badly damaged F-86 of his wing commander to a safe landing at an air base near Seoul. He will receive the Distinguished Service Cross for the mission.
A SNCASO S.O. 4000 (prototype of the Sud Vautour fighter-bomber) becomes the first European aircraft to exceed the speed of sound in a shallow dive.

July
 Chilean President Carlos Ibáñez del Campo grants the Chilean Navy the authority to operate helicopters and transport aircraft. It is the first time that the navy has had administrative control over aircraft since 1930.
 The Moroccan airlines Compagnie Chérifienne de'l Air (Air Atlas) and Compagnie Chérifienne de Transports Aériens Air Maroc merge to form Royal Air Maroc—Compagnie Nationale de Transports Aériens, with a fleet of six Sud-Ouest Bretagnes, four Curtiss C-46 Commandos, five Douglas DC-3s, and two SNCASE Languedocs. The new airline will be renamed Royal Air Maroc in June 1957.
 July 1
 The responsibility for air traffic control over West Germany is transferred from the Allies to West German authorities.
 The Aero Vodochody company is formed in Czechoslovakia, carrying on the "Aero" name of Aero Tovarna.
 July 3 – The first tethered flight by the Rolls-Royce Thrust Measuring Rig VTOL aircraft takes place.
 July 8 – Sabena begins the first international helicopter services, linking Brussels (Belgium) with destinations in the Netherlands and France.
 July 10 – A Royal Norwegian Air Force F-84 Thunderjet and a United States Air Force C-47D Skytrain collide in mid-air near Stavanger Airport, Sola, in Stavanger, Norway, while the C-47D is on final approach to the airport. Both aircraft crash, killing the F-84 pilot and all 10 people aboard the C-47D.
 Mid-July – At the request of Rear Admiral Joseph J. "Jocko" Clark, the commander of the U.S. Navys aircraft carrier task force, Task Force 77, off Korea, atomic bombs are placed aboard Task Force 77 carriers as a "precautionary measure," in case they are needed if the Korean War expands into Manchuria.
 July 17
Lieutenant Guy P. Bordelon scores his fifth aerial victory, becoming the United States Navy's only ace of the Korean War. He had scored all five victories since June 29, using an F4U-5N Corsair night fighter to shoot down North Korean Polikarpov Po-2 (NATO reporting name "Mule") biplanes making night harassment raids.
A U.S. Navy Fairchild R4Q-2 Packet carrying Reserve Officers' Training Corps (ROTC) students from summer training in Corpus Christi, Texas, to Norfolk, Virginia, crashes into a wooded area during its initial climb after taking off following a refueling stop at Naval Air Station Whiting Field, Florida, killing 44 of the 46 people on board.
They average 170 sorties per day, and Princeton aircraft fly 184 sorties on one day.
 July 27
Aircraft from the aircraft carriers of U.S. Navy Task Force 77 attack airfields in North Korea. Since July 1, U.S. Navy carrier aircraft have flown 6,423 sorties over Korea, and aircraft ordnance tonnage has doubled since May 1.
Hours before the armistice that ends the Korean War, U.S. Air Force pilot Ralph S. Parr, flying an F-86F Sabre, scores the final aerial victory of the war, shooting down in flames a Soviet Ilyushin Il-12 (NATO reporting name "Coach") cargo aircraft in restricted airspace over North Korea with one long burst of gunfire, killing all 21 people aboard the Il-12. It is his 10th victory, all of them scored during 30 missions flown in the last seven weeks of the war, tying him with five other pilots for total kills during the conflict. The Soviet Union claims the Il-12, which crashes  from Mao-erh-shan in the People's Republic of China, was a civilian aircraft carrying VIPs, but Parr claims it was marked with a military red star.
The Korean War ends. During the war, the United States has dropped 635,000 short tons (576.062 metric tons) of bombs – compared with 503,000 short tons (456,314 metric tons) throughout the entire Pacific Theater of Operations during World War II – as well as 32,557 short tons (29,535 metric tons) of napalm. The U.S. Navy has flown 276,000 combat sorties – only 7,000 fewer than it had in all of World War II – and dropped 177,000 short tons (160,573 metric tons) of bombs – 77,000 short tons (67,132 metric tons) more than it did during all of World War II. It has lost 1,248 aircraft, 564 of them (including 302 F4U Corsairs and 124 AD Skyraiders) to enemy action. Since mid-1951, the U.S. Navy and U.S. Marine Corps combined have lost 384 tactical aircraft to enemy ground fire, including 193 Corsairs and 102 Skyraiders. A typical U.S. Navy carrier air wing has lost 10 percent of its aircrew during its deployment to Korea. Aircraft of the British Royal Navys Fleet Air Arm have flown over 20,000 carrier sorties during the war.
 July 28
Two B-47 Stratojet bombers of the U.S. Air Forces 305th Bombardment Wing set speed records, when one flies from RCAF Goose Bay, Labrador, to RAF Fairford, England, in 4 hours 14 minutes and the other flies from Limestone Air Force Base, Maine, to RAF Fairford in 4 hours 45 minutes.

August
 A Royal Air Force English Electric Canberra on an intelligence-gathering flight overflies the secret Kapustin Yar rocket test site in the Soviet Union.
 August 1 – Indian Airlines begins operations.
 August 20 – Using aerial refueling, 17 U.S. Air Force F-84G Thunderjets make the longest-ever nonstop flight by jet fighters, flying  from the United States to the United Kingdom.

September
 September 1
All 42 people on board die, including French violinist Jacques Thibaud.
 The United States Air Force conducts the world's first jet-to-jet aerial refueling when a KB-47 Stratojet tanker refuels a B-47 Stratojet bomber.
 A Regina Cargo Airlines Douglas C-47K Skytrain (registration N19941) carrying military personnel on a charter flight from Fort Ord in Monterey, California, to McChord Air Force Base in Tacoma, Washington, crashes southeast of Vail, Washington, killing all 21 people on board.
 September 15 – West Germany establishes its Vorläufige Bundesstelle für Luftfahrtgerät und Flugunfalluntersuchung (Provisional Federal Office for Avionic Devices and Investigation of Aviation Accidents).
 September 16 – American Airlines Flight 723, a Convair CV-240-0, crashes in Colonie, New York, while on final approach in fog to land at Albany Airport, killing all 28 people on board.
 September 21 – North Korean pilot No Kum-Sok defects to South Korea, bringing his MiG-15 with him to Seoul and collecting a $US 100,000 reward.
 September 28 – Resort Airlines Flight 1081 – a Curtiss C-46F-1-CU Commando (registration N66534) – crashes on approach to Standiford Field in Louisville, Kentucky, and bursts into flames, killing 25 of the 41 people on board.

October
 October – Chapter One of the Milwaukee, Wisconsin-based Experimental Aircraft Association is formed in Riverside, California.
It is the first time that a carrier-capable combat aircraft in its normal configuration sets a world speed record.
 October 10 – A British Royal Air Force English Electric Canberra wins the 1953 London to Christchurch air race, flying  from the UK to New Zealand in 23 hours 50 minutes.
 October 14
 A Sabena Convair CV-240-12 (registration OO-AWQ) loses engine power just after taking off from Frankfurt International Airport in Frankfurt-am-Main, West Germany, and crashes, killing all 44 people on board.
 October 19 – During a domestic flight in Mexico from Aeropuerto del Norte outside Monterrey to the Nueva Ciudad Guerrero airstrip carrying officials and reporters to the inauguration of the Falcon Dam, a Pemex Douglas DC-3 (registration XC-PMX) crashes in a ravine near Mamulique, killing all 15 people on board.
 October 20 – A Transworld Airlines Lockheed Constellation makes the first non-stop scheduled passenger flight across the continental United States.
 October 28 – SABENA becomes the first airline to offer transatlantic service from the north of England when it inaugurates a Brussels-Manchester-New York City route with a flight by a Douglas DC-6B (registration OO-CTH).
 October 29
 The British Commonwealth Pacific Airlines Douglas DC-6 Resolution, operating as Flight 304, crashes near Woodside, California, while on initial approach to San Francisco International Airport in San Mateo County, California, killing all 19 people on board. Among the dead is pianist William Kapell.
 October 30 – The United States National Security Council document NSC 162/2 is adopted. It states that the United States military posture must remain strong, "with emphasis on the capability of inflicting massive retaliatory damage by offensive striking power," and that "the United States will consider nuclear weapons to be as available for use as other munitions." The document brings the term "massive retaliation" into general use and inaugurates the "New Look" defense policy of President Dwight D. Eisenhower, which reduces American military spending and force levels and places a great reliance on strategic power, particularly on long-range nuclear bombers, to defend the United States and to deter foreign militaries from aggressive activities abroad.

November
 The United Kingdoms first operational atomic bomb, "Blue Danube," is delivered to the Bomber Command stockpile at RAF Wittering in eastern England, concluding the High Explosive Research project to develop it.
 November 3 – A Lloyd Aéreo Boliviano Douglas DC-3-314 (registration CP-600) crashes on the top of the Rodeo Pampa mountain range south of Tarabuco, Bolivia, killing all 28 people on board.
 November 12 – The LADE Junkers Ju 52/3msai Rio Negro (registration T-159) collides in mid-air with an Argentine Air Force de Havilland DH.104 Dove near Villa Mugueta, Argentina. The Dove crashes, killing all seven people on board. The Ju 52 pilot attempts an emergency landing but loses control just before touchdown and the Ju 52 also crashes, killing all 13 people on board.
 November 15 - The first Airmail service begins into Death Valley National Monument, landing at Furnace Creek Airport (L06). This was part of airmail route AM-105.
 November 17 – Two United States Air Force Kaiser-Frazer C-119F Flying Boxcars collide in mid-air due to an engine failure while flying as part of a 12-plane formation dropping paratroopers over the Holland Drop Zone at Fort Bragg, North Carolina. One C-119F makes a successful emergency landing, but the other descends over the drop zone, striking a number of paratroopers and killing 10 of them before crashing, killing all five people aboard the plane.
 November 30 – Former Governor of Michigan Kim Sigler and all four of his passengers die when the Beechcraft Bonanza he is piloting crashes into a television broadcast tower near Augusta, Michigan, on a foggy night.

December
 December 2 – The Douglas X-3 Stiletto completes its 20th flight. The National Advisory Committee for Aeronautics (NACA) will turn it over to the United States Air Force for its next six flights, after which the Air Force will return it to NACA.
 December 4 – An Aviaco Bristol 170 Freighter 21 crashes into the side of a mountain peak obscured by rain near Guaderrama, Spain, 20 minutes prior to an anticipated landing at Barajas Airport in Madrid, killing 23 of the 33 people on board.
 December 11 – A Royal Air Force Avro Shackleton MR.2 crashes into the sea off Argyll, Scotland, during an antisubmarine warfare exercise, killing its entire crew of 10.
 December 12
 An Indian Airlines Douglas C-47A-DK Skytrain experiences engine trouble just after takeoff from Sonegaon Airport in Nagpur, India. When the pilot attempts to return to the airport, he banks too steeply, and the aircraft loses height rapidly, crashes in a field, and burns, killing 13 of the 14 people on board.
 December 19 –A Sabena Convair CV-240 (registration OO-AWO) strikes the ground  short of the runway while on final approach to Kloten Airport in low visibility conditions. One passenger is killed, but the other 39 passengers and all three crew members survive.
 December 20 – Searching for the nine-man crew of a United States Navy Consolidated PB4Y-2 Privateer that had disappeared while tracking Typhoon Doris, a U.S. Navy Douglas R4D-8 Skytrain crashes into a volcanic crater on Agrihan in the Mariana Islands, killing its entire 10-man crew. Its wreckage will not be discovered until December 26.
 December 29 – A French Air Force Nord 2501 Noratlas disappears over the Pyrénées Mountains with the loss of all 10 people on board during a flight from French Algeria to Mont-De-Marsan Airport in France. A search party will discover its wreckage on Pic de Costabonne on January 5, 1954.

First flights

January
 January 2 - Sud-Ouest Djinn
 January 3 - Cessna 310
 January 5 - Ambrosini Sagittario
 January 14 – Convair XF2Y-1, prototype of the Convair F2Y Sea Dart (inadvertent short flight during intended fast taxi run)
 January 27 - Hurel-Dubois HD.31
 January 29 - Morane-Saulnier MS.755 Fleuret

March
 March 2 - Sud-Ouest SO 9000 Trident
 March 4 - Bell HSL
 March 7 – Ilyushin Il-40 (NATO reporting name "Brawny")

April
 April 9 – Convair XF2Y-1, prototype of the Convair F2Y Sea Dart (official first flight)
 April 21 - Doman LZ-5

May
 May 9 - SNCASO Farfadet
 May 16 - Leduc O.21
 May 18 - Douglas DC-7
 May 19 - Grumman XF10F Jaguar
 May 25 - North American YF-100A, prototype of the North American F-100 Super Sabre, by George Welch

June
 June 10 - Potez 75
 June 14 - Blackburn Beverley
 June 15 – Farman F.520 Monitor III
 June 19 – Piaggio P.149

July
 July 3 – North American FJ-3 Fury

August
 Westland Whirlwind
 August 1 – SNCASE Baroudeur

September
 Lualdi-Tassotti ES 53
 Mooney M20
 September 3 - Pilatus P-3
 September 21 - DINFIA IA 35 Huanquero

October
 October 13 - North American X-10
 October 13 - Short Seamew
 October 24 - Convair YF-102, prototype of the F-102 Delta Dagger

December
 December 10 – Beech Super 18
 December 14 – Miles M.77 Sparrowjet
 December 23 – Lockheed XFV-1 (unplanned "jump" prior to first official flight)

Entered service 
 Late 1953 – McDonnell F3H Demon with the United States Navy

January
 January 13 – Vickers Viscount with British European Airways

May
 Westland Wyvern with 813 Naval Air Squadron, Fleet Air Arm, Royal Navy

November
 November 29 - Douglas DC-7 with American Airlines

Retirements 
 Douglas Skyrocket by the National Advisory Committee for Aeronautics.
 Henschel Hs 123 by the Spanish Air Force
 Lockheed R6V Constitution by the United States Navy
 North American F-82 Twin Mustang by the United States Air Force
 Saunders-Roe SR.45 Princess

References

Bridgman, Leonard. Jane's All The World's Aircraft 1953–54. London: Jane's All The World's Aircraft Publishing Co. Ltd., 1953.
Bridgman, Leonard. Jane's All The World's Aircraft 1958–59. London: Sampson Low, Marston & Company, Ltd., 1958.
 de Narbonne, Roland. "Juin 1953, dans l'aéronautique française: Le Potez 75 à l'assaut des chars". Le Fana de l'Aviation, June 2013, No. 523. p. 78. (in French).
 de Narbonne, Roland. "Août 1953, dans l'aéronautique française: SE 5000 "Baroudeur": Un chariot bien encombrant". Le Fana de l'Aviation, August 2013, No. 525. pp. 74–79. (in French).

 
Aviation by year